Alfred Martineau (11 November 1868 – 2 February 1940) was an English cricketer.

Alfred Martineau was educated at Uppingham School and King's College, Cambridge. A right-handed batsman and right-arm slow bowler, he played two first-class matches for Cambridge University in 1889. His brother Lionel also played first-class cricket, as did his cousins Hubert and Philip.

References

1868 births
1940 deaths
People from Esher
English cricketers
Cambridge University cricketers
People educated at Uppingham School
Alumni of King's College, Cambridge